Roland Raymond Marie Henri Paul Journu (6 August 1906 – 13 June 1989) was a French tennis player.

A native of Bordeaux, Journu was most active in the 1930s and counted the Swiss International Championships amongst his tour titles. He made the singles fourth round at Roland Garros in 1936 and 1937. At the 1937 French Championships he was also a mixed doubles finalist with Marie-Louise Horn, losing to Simonne Mathieu and Yvon Petra.

Grand Slam finals

Mixed doubles: 1 (1 runner-up)

References

External links
 

1906 births
1989 deaths
French male tennis players
Tennis players from Bordeaux